John Hall (1575 – 25 November 1635) was a physician and son-in-law of William Shakespeare.

Life
He was born at Carlton, Bedfordshire and studied at Queens' College, Cambridge from 1589, receiving a B.A. in 1593 and a M.A. in 1597. He became a physician, although he did not hold an English medical degree; it has been speculated that he studied medicine in France.

He established a practice in Stratford-upon-Avon, where he was the only doctor in the town. He married Shakespeare's daughter Susanna on 5 June 1607. They had one daughter, Elizabeth. Their home in Stratford, Hall's Croft, is now open to the public. After Shakespeare's death, they moved into his former house at New Place.

Hall appears to have had a close relationship with his father-in-law, as they are recorded being in agreement over a local issue regarding enclosure in 1613. They are also known to have travelled together to London on business in 1614.

Defamation case
Hall was a leading local Puritan. He had supported the Puritan vicar, Thomas Wilson, against whom there was much local opposition. In 1613, a member of the anti-Wilson faction, John Lane, defamed Susanna, claiming she had committed adultery with one Ralph Smith, a 35-year-old haberdasher, and had caught a venereal disease from Smith. On 15 July the Halls brought suit for slander against Lane in the Consistory Court at Worcester. Robert Whatcott, who three years later witnessed Shakespeare's will, testified for the Halls, but Lane failed to appear. Lane was found guilty and excommunicated. He was later involved in a riot to protest against Wilson.

Writings
Hall prepared two notebooks of his case notes with the intention that they be published. They were purchased and translated from Latin by James Cooke (1614–1688), a surgeon. The earliest case, in Stratford, dates from 1611, making it almost certain that Hall lived and worked in Stratford from at least the time of his marriage. The first notebook still survives, but the original manuscript of the second notebook has been lost.
 Wells, Greg; Edmondson, Paul (Eds.): John Hall, Master of Physicke - a casebook from Shakespeare's Stratford, Manchester : Manchester University Press, 2020,

Portrayals
The slander case has been used as the subject of a play, The Herbal Bed, by Peter Whelan.  In the original production Hall was played by Liam Cunningham.

He was portrayed by Tom Hiddleston in A Waste of Shame: The Mystery of Shakespeare and His Sonnets, a TV film first broadcast on BBC Four on 22 November 2005 as part of a supporting programme for the BBC's ShakespeaRe-Told season.

Hadley Fraser portrayed him in the 2018 movie All Is True, directed by Kenneth Branagh.

References

External links
 Shakespeare and Queens'

16th-century English medical doctors
17th-century English medical doctors
Shakespeare family
1575 births
1636 deaths
People of the Elizabethan era
17th-century English Puritans
Alumni of Queens' College, Cambridge
People from the Borough of Bedford